is a Prefectural Natural Park in southeast Kumamoto Prefecture, Japan. Established in 1955, the park spans the municipalities of Mizukami, Taragi, and Yunomae.

See also
 National Parks of Japan

References

External links
  Map of Natural Parks of Kumamoto Prefecture

Parks and gardens in Kumamoto Prefecture
Protected areas established in 1955
1955 establishments in Japan